Hugh Fraser (born 23 October 1945) is an English actor, theatre director and author. He is best known for his portrayal of Captain Hastings in the television series Agatha Christie's Poirot opposite David Suchet as Hercule Poirot and for his role as the Duke of Wellington (replacing David Troughton) in the Sharpe television series. 

Fraser was born in Westminster but grew up in the Midlands. He studied acting at the Webber Douglas Academy of Dramatic Art and the London Academy of Music and Dramatic Art. Fraser's first big break came after portraying Anthony Eden in the 1978 television series Edward & Mrs. Simpson, with Edward Fox, after which he was frequently cast as upper class or aristocratic characters, such as Mr Talmann in Peter Greenaway's The Draughtsman's Contract.

Early life
Born in Westminster in 1945, but brought up in the Midlands, Hugh Fraser studied acting at the Webber Douglas Academy of Dramatic Art and the London Academy of Music and Dramatic Art. As a member of folk band Telltale, Hugh co-wrote and performed the theme music for Rainbow, the ITV children's television series.

Work

Acting
Fraser's first big break came after portraying Anthony Eden in the 1978 television series Edward & Mrs. Simpson, with Edward Fox, after which he was frequently cast as upper class or aristocratic characters, such as Mr Talmann in Peter Greenaway's The Draughtsman's Contract.

He has regularly appeared on film and television and is best known for his portrayals of Captain Hastings in Agatha Christie's Poirot, opposite David Suchet, and of Duke of Wellington (replacing David Troughton) in Sharpe opposite Sean Bean. 

In the 1980s, he appeared in the BBC thriller Edge of Darkness. Fraser can be frequently heard narrating the audiobooks of Christie's works, which are currently published by HarperCollins. 

His film credits include Curse of the Pink Panther, 101 Dalmatians and Patriot Games along with his Sharpe co-star Sean Bean. He has also worked in theatre, playing Claudio in Much Ado About Nothing with the Royal Shakespeare Company in 1979. He has guest-starred in the Doctor Who audio dramas Circular Time (2007) and Cradle of the Snake (2010), and in 2003, alongside Martin Shaw in Death in Holy Orders.

Fraser guest starred in a Season 2 episode of the British audio comedy podcast Wooden Overcoats, which his wife, Belinda Lang, was the narrator of.

Directing
Fraser has been an associate tutor, director, and member of the audition panel at the Royal Academy of Dramatic Art, specialising in Shakespeare. He has also directed several plays, including a production of David Mamet's adaptation of Chekhov's Uncle Vanya, which was staged at Wilton's Music Hall in London in January 2007, with Rachael Stirling as Yelena and the first London production in nearly a century of Kate O'Brien’s play Distinguished Villa at the Finborough Theatre in 2022.

Writing
Fraser has also become an author; he is the author of a series of crime fiction thrillers featuring contract killer Rina Walker. His first novel, Harm, was published in 2015, followed by Threat in 2016. The third in the Rina Walker series, Malice, came out in October 2017 and Stealth, in 2018

During his appearance on Pointless Celebrities (30 Jan 2021), flute-player Hugh explained that he composed the theme melody for kids’ programme Rainbow along with other songs for the show and theme tunes for other (unmentioned) TV series.

Personal life
He is married to the actress Belinda Lang and has one daughter, Lily.

Selected film and television roles

References

External links
 

 Interview with Hugh Fraser at Classic Film & TV Cafe
 

1945 births
Living people
Alumni of the Webber Douglas Academy of Dramatic Art
Audiobook narrators
English male film actors
English male television actors
English folk musicians
Male actors from London
People from Westminster
20th-century English male actors
21st-century English male actors